, is a Japanese vocalist known for his theme song performances in Digimon, Zatch Bell! and Dragon Ball Kai, the last of which he sang "Dragon Soul" and "Yeah! Break! Care! Break!" as one-half of a special unit, Dragon Soul.

Overview
Tanimoto's works include "One Vision," which is the Matrix Evolution theme for Digimon Tamers. he also does the main theme for DarkKnightmon and Kiriha in part 2 of Digimon Xros Wars, two of the three opening songs for the anime Zatch Bell!, "Kimi ni Kono Koe ga Todokimasu you ni" (lit. "I Hope My Voice Will Reach You") and "Mienai Tsubasa" (lit. "Invisible Wings"), and the opening of the Super Sentai series Jūken Sentai Gekiranger.

Tanimoto performed "Dragon Soul" the opening and "Yeah! Break! Care! Break!" the ending theme songs for Dragon Ball Kai, the revised and reanimated version of the anime series Dragon Ball Z, as one-half of Dragon Soul. The single of "Dragon Soul" was released on May 20, 2009, peak ranked 23rd on Oricon singles chart and remained for 11 consecutive weeks. The single of "Yeah! Break! Care! Break!" was released on June 24, 2009, peak ranked 23rd on Oricon singles chart and remained for 6 consecutive weeks.

Notes

External links
 
 Takayoshi Tanimoto singles at Oricon 

1975 births
Living people
Musicians from Hiroshima Prefecture
21st-century Japanese singers